The Bratislava Region ((until 1919)) is one of the administrative regions of Slovakia. Its capital is Bratislava. The region was first established in 1923 and its present borders exist from 1996. It is the smallest of the eight regions of Slovakia as well as the most urbanized, most developed and most productive by GDP per capita.

Geography
The region is located in the south-western part of Slovakia and has an area of 2,053 km2 and a population of 622,706 (2009). The region is split by the Little Carpathians which start in Bratislava and continue north-eastwards; these mountains separate two lowlands, the Záhorie lowland in the west and the fertile Danubian Lowland in the east, which grows mainly wheat and maize. Major rivers in the region are the Morava River, the Danube and the Little Danube; the last of these, together with the Danube, encircle the Žitný ostrov in the south-east. There are three protected landscape areas in the region: the Little Carpathians, Záhorie and Dunajské luhy. The region borders Trnava Region in the north and east, Győr-Moson-Sopron county in Hungary in the south, Burgenland in Austria in the south-west and Lower Austria in the west.

History
The first known permanent settlement of the area of today's Bratislava was the Linear Pottery Culture, around 5000 BC in the Neolithic era. Around 200 BC, the Celtic Boii tribe established an oppidum on the site of today's Bratislava Castle. The Romans established their camp Gerulata on the right bank of the Danube in the 1st century and remained there until the 4th century. The area was part of the Principality of Nitra and later, in the 9th century, of Great Moravia. From the 10th century onwards, it became part of the Principality of Hungary (later the Kingdom of Hungary) and almost the whole area was part of Pozsony county (the exception being three villages south of Bratislava which were part of Moson county). After the break-up of Austria-Hungary in 1918, region was newly defined in 1923 and present Bratislava region approximately copies its 1923 borders. Bratislava Regio was abolished in 1928 and replaced by a new territorial unit called the "Slovak Land". During the WWII Slovak Republic, Bratislava county was restored, albeit with somewhat modified borders. After the restoration of Czechoslovakia, the pre-breakup status was restored. From 1949 to 1960 a unit named Bratislava Region existed, but it was replaced in 1960 by the Western Slovak Region (except from 1 July 1969 to 28 December 1970; Bratislava was partly separate from 1968, and from 1971 it was a separate region). After abolition of the regions in 1990, the current system was introduced in 1996. Since the administrative regions became autonomous in 2002, it has been governed by the Bratislava Self-Governing Region.

Demographics

Although it is the smallest region of Slovakia by area, it does not have the lowest population. The largest city is Bratislava (425,459) and the second largest is Pezinok (21,334). The region has a high level of urbanization (83.2%). According to the 2001 census, there were 599,015 inhabitants in the region, with most of them being Slovaks (91.2%), with minorities of Hungarians (4.6%) and Czechs (1.6%).

Economy
The economy of the Bratislava Region accounts for about a quarter(EUR 20 billion) of the Slovak GDP. Bratislava has one of the highest GDP per capita at PPP of among whole E.U. €51,200(~$70,000). It is marked by a strong tertiary sector, while the primary sector has a share of only around 1% and the secondary sector around 20%. Important branches include chemical, automobile, machine, electrotechnical and food industries.

Politics
The current governor of the Bratislava region is Juraj Droba (SaS). He won with 20,4 %. In the 2017 election, the regional parliament was elected as well:

2017 elections
 Juraj Droba (SaS) won the 2017 governor's elections against several other candidates.

2013 elections

Pavol Frešo (SDKÚ–DS) won the 2013 governor's elections  over the centre-left candidate Monika Beňová (Smer–SD). Pavol Frešo was also supported by SaS, OKS, Most–Híd, SMK-MKP, KDH and SZ.

2009 elections

The 2009 governor's elections were won by Pavol Frešo (SDKÚ–DS) over the independent candidate Vladimír Bajan. Pavol Frešo was also supported by SaS, OKS, SMK-MKP and KDH.

Administrative division
The Bratislava Region consists of 8 districts: Malacky, Pezinok, Senec and 5 districts of Bratislava (Bratislava I – Bratislava V, which form the city of Bratislava).

There are 73 municipalities in the region, of which 7 are towns.

Notes

References

External links
 Bratislavský samosprávny kraj Official website
 Bratislava Region Tourism

 
Regions of Slovakia
NUTS 2 statistical regions of the European Union
Boii